The Man in Gray is a 1961 Italian short documentary film produced by Benedetto Benedetti. It was nominated for an Academy Award for Best Documentary Short.

References

External links

1961 films
1961 documentary films
1961 short films
1960s Italian-language films
1960s short documentary films
Italian short documentary films
1960s Italian films